The 1982 Arizona gubernatorial election took place on November 2, 1982, for the post of Governor of Arizona. Democratic incumbent Bruce Babbitt defeated Republican nominee Leo Corbet and Libertarian candidate and former U.S. Representative Sam Steiger. Evan Mecham unsuccessfully ran for the Republican nomination.

General election

Results

References

1982
1982 United States gubernatorial elections
Gubernatorial